Robert Wood (1717 – 9 September 1771) was an Irish-British traveller, classical scholar, civil servant and politician.

He was the son of the Revd James Wood of Summerhill, County Meath and educated at Glasgow University (1732) and the Middle Temple (1736).

In 1750-1751 Wood travelled around the Levant with two wealthy young Oxford scholars James Dawkins and John Bouverie (who died of a fever early in their expedition) and an Italian draftsman Giovanni Battista Borra. Their primary goal was to explore the Troad and locate the key sites mentioned by Homer. Moving south into Syria, they then took careful measurements and drawings of the ancient Roman ruins of Palmyra and Baalbek. The results of these were published in 1753 and 1757 in both English and French editions and were among the first systematic publications of ancient buildings. Both works were of great influence on neoclassical architecture in Britain, Continental Europe and America. From 1753 to 1756, Wood was the tutor and travelling companion (or Bear-leader as such men were known at the time) of the young Duke of Bridgewater, the richest peer in England, in making the Grand Tour.

In 1756 he was appointed Under Secretary to the Secretary of State for the Southern Department, who was initially Pitt the Elder. It was to Wood that Granville famously quoted an appropriate passage from Homer's Iliad as he signed the Treaty of Paris on his deathbed in 1763 (Wood published an essay on Homer in 1765, which stated that true knowledge can come only after one has had an opportunity to evaluate one's own society in relation to others). In 1764, following the instructions of Secretary of State Halifax, Wood acted under a general warrant to seize the papers of John Wilkes, who subsequently won damages of £1000 from him for trespass.

In 1761 Wood was elected Member of Parliament for the Duke of Bridgewater's pocket borough of Brackley in Northamptonshire, which he continued to represent until his death. He was also Master of the Revels in Ireland, and at one point it was rumoured that he would be appointed Secretary to the Lord-Lieutenant of Ireland, but the Lord Lieutenant objected to Wood's "public and private character" as well as his "mean birth", and the appointment was never made.

After his death on 9 September 1771, Wood was buried near his home in Putney at Putney Old Burial Ground, in a white marble sarcophagus engraved with an epitaph written by Horace Walpole. He had married Ann, the daughter of Thomas Skottowe, with whom he had two sons and a daughter. One son Robert was also an MP.

Writings 
 Les ruines de Palmyre, autrement dite Tedmor, au desert. London (1753).
 The ruins of Palmyra; otherwise Tedmor in the desart. London (1753).
 Les Ruines de Balbec, autrement dite Heliopolis dans la Coelosyrie. London (1757).
 The ruins of Balbec, otherwise Heliopolis in Coelosyria. London (1757).
 An essay on the original genius of Homer. London (1769).

References 

 Sir John Summerson: Architecture in Britain 1530-1830. Pelican History of Art. 9th edition. New Haven / London: Yale University Press (1993) p. 380-381.
 Unpacking Ruins: Architecture from Antiquity. Exhibition at the Central Library, University of Otago / New Zealand, 12 September – 28 November 2002.
 Robert Beatson, A Chronological Register of Both Houses of Parliament (London: Longman, Hurst, Res & Orme, 1807)

External links 
 
 Preface to the Ruins of Palmyra.
 
 www.saudiaramcoworld.com
 

English antiquarians
1717 births
1771 deaths
British MPs 1761–1768
British MPs 1768–1774
Members of the Parliament of Great Britain for English constituencies